Warren Central High School is a public high school of Vicksburg Warren School District located in unincorporated Warren County (with a Vicksburg postal address), Mississippi, United States. During the 201516 school year, it had 1240 students in its main campus (Building A and B).

History 
In 1965, the three existing Warren County high schools, Culkin, Redwood, and Jett, were consolidated to form a unified secondary facility on Highway 27 South that was named Warren Central Senior High School. About 800 students and 40 certified faculty members welcomed one of the first ultra-modern school facilities in Mississippi, all-electric with central heat and air.

In 1967, Warren Central Junior High School was built on the campus adjacent to the high school building. To meet the need of an expanding student population, a new junior high school facility was constructed in 1973 on the land across the highway from the high school. The original junior high school building was converted into Building B of the high school.

By 1982, Warren Central's enrollment peaked with more than 2,000 students and a curriculum of approximately 170 courses. A nature trail and outdoor classroom area was constructed adjacent to the campus in 1990 with help from the International Paper Company. In 2006, a new Fine Arts building was constructed to house the Big Blue Band and Choral programs. As of 201920 the school reported 1,331 students enrolled.

Extra-curricular activities
The school hosts a variety of extra-curricular activities such as Mock Trial, National Honor Society, FIRST Robotics, Quiz Bowl, Future Teachers of America, Red Cross, First Priority, Beta Club, Mu Alpha Theta, 4-H, FBLA, NorseStar (student newspaper), Valhalla (yearbook), GIVE (Gentlemen of Integrity, Valor and Excellence), and others.

Athletics 
WCHS' athletic teams are known as the Vikings (men's) and Lady Vikes (women's). It competes in MHSAA (Mississippi High School Athletic Association) Class 6A, Mississippi's largest classification. WCHS's football program, one of the most historically successful programs in the state, has 2 state championships (1988 and 1994). It made the playoffs for 21 consecutive years between 1985-2005 and has 33 playoff appearances since 1981. The Lady Vikes basketball program has won 3 state championships, in 1986, 1987, and 1989. Warren Central's baseball program also has one state championship, in 2001, finishing 4th in the USA Today national poll. The Lady Vikes women's golf team won the MHSAA Class III state championship in 2014.

Warren Central also offers soccer, track, slow and fast pitch softball, cheer and dance, swimming, men's golf, cross country, volleyball, men's and women's powerlifting, and bowling.

WCHS, along with its sister school, Vicksburg High School, annually hosts the Red Carpet Bowl Classic, Mississippi's longest-running football bowl game. The annual season opening double header alternates between the schools. The two schools also alternate as host of the Red Carpet Basketball Classic each February.

Notable alumni
 Kevin Ford, member of the Mississippi House of Representatives
 Jay Hopson, (1988), head football coach at the University of Southern Mississippi
 Dan Jones, (1970), 16th Chancellor of the University of Mississippi 
 Tony Smith, (1989) NFL running back 
 Taylor Tankersley, (2001), pitcher for the Miami Marlins
 James Williams, (1997), NFL wide receiver 
 Keith Wright, (1974) wide receiver for the Cleveland Browns
 Jaelyn Young, convicted of conspiring to provide material support to a terrorist organization

References

External links 
 
 Vicksburg-Warren School District
 National Center for Educational Statistics
 MaxPreps School Page
 http://www.olemisssports.com/genrel/090908aaa.html

Public high schools in Mississippi
Schools in Warren County, Mississippi
Buildings and structures in Vicksburg, Mississippi